The Canton metropolitan area may refer to:
The Guangzhou metropolitan area, China
The Canton, Ohio metropolitan area, United States
The Canton, Illinois micropolitan area, United States

See also
Canton (disambiguation)